Pingyuan may refer to:

Places
Pingyuan Province (平原省), a short-lived former province of China
Pingyuan Prefecture (平远州), a former name of Zhijin, Guizhou, China
Pingyuan County, Guangdong (平远县), of Meizhou, Guangdong
Pingyuan County, Shandong (平原县), of Dezhou, Shandong
Pingyuan Commandery, a historic commandery
Pingyuan, Pingtan County (平原镇), town in Pingtan County, Fujian
Pingyuan, Yingjiang County (平原镇), town in Yingjiang County, Yunnan
Pingyuan Township, Dejiang County (平原乡), in Dejiang County, Guizhou
Pingyuan Township, Xinxiang (平原乡), in Weibin District, Xinxiang, Henan

Other uses
Lord Pingyuan (died 251 BC), one of the Four Lords of the Warring States
Chinese gunboat Pingyuan, the first Chinese-built ironclad